Erythroneura octonotata, the eight-spotted leafhopper, is a species of leafhopper in the family Cicadellidae.

References

Further reading

External links

 

Insects described in 1862
Erythroneurini